The 1900 University of Utah football team was an American football team that represented the University of Utah as an independent during the 1900 college football season. Head coach Harvey Holmes led the team to a 2–1 record.

Schedule

References

University of Utah
Utah Utes football seasons
University of Utah football